The Muhammad Naji al-Otari government was the second Syrian government formed during the presidency of Bashar al-Assad. It was announced on 10 September 2003, by Prime Minister Muhammad Mustafa Mero. The cabinet lasted until 29 March 2011, and resigned in the wake of the Syrian Civil War.

 Prime minister: Muhammad Naji al-Otari
 Deputy Prime Minister for Economic Affairs: Abdullah Dardari

Original cabinet

Portfolios
 Minister of Foreign Affairs: Farouk al-Sharaa
 Minister of Finance:  Mohammed Al Hussein
 Minister of Defense: Mustafa Tlass
 Minister of Higher Education: Hani Murtada
 Minister of Local Administration: Hilal Atrash
 Minister of Tourism:  Saadallah Agha al-Qalaa
 Minister of Agriculture and Agrarian Reform: Adel Safar
 Minister of Expatriates: Bouthaina Shaaban
 Minister of Education:  Ali Saad
 Minister of Economy and Trade: Ghassan Al Rifai
 Minister of Health: Muhammad Iyad Shatti
 Minister of Justice: Nizar Assi
 Minister of Endowments: Muhammad Ziyadeh
 Minister of Irrigation: Nader Bunni
 Minister of Social Affairs and Labor: Siham Dello
 Minister of Oil and Mineral Reserves: Ibrahim Haddad
 Minister of Interior: Ali Hammoud
 Minister of Information: Ahmad Hassan
 Minister of Culture: Mahmoud Sayyed
 Minister of Electricity: Munib Saem Dahr
 Minister of Housing and Construction: Nihad Mshantat
 Minister of Transport: Makram Obeid
 Minister of Industry: Muhammad Safi Abu Dan
 Minister of Communication and Technology: Muhammad Bashir Monjed

Ministers of State
 Minister of State for Presidential Affairs: Ghassan al-Lahham
 Minister of State for Administrative Development: Yousef Suleiman al-Ahmad
 Minister of State for the Syrian Arab Red Crescent: Bashar al-Shaar
 Minister of State for Vital Projects: Muhammad Kharrat
 Minister of State for Population Affairs: Dr. Ghayyath Jaraatly
 Minister of State for Parliamentary Affairs: Hussam al-Asswad

Subsequent reshuffles

1st reshuffle
12 May 2004: One minister was replaced.
Minister of Defense: Lt. Gen. Hasan Turkmani

2nd reshuffle
4 October 2004: Eight ministers were replaced.
 Minister of Interior: Ghazi Kanaan
 Minister of Industry: Ghassan Tayyara
 Minister of Endowments: Ziad Al Din Sl Ayoubi
 Minister of Health: Maher Hammami
 Minister of Economy and Trade: Amer Husni Lutfi
 Minister of Information: Mahdi Dakhlallah
 Minister of Justice: Muhammad Al Ghafri
 Minister of Social Affairs and Labor: Diala Al Hajj Aref

3rd reshuffle
21 February 2006: 15 ministers were replaced.
 Minister of Foreign Affairs: Walid Muallem
 Minister of Information: Muhsen Bilal
 Minister of Interior: Bassam Abdel Majeed
 Minister of Higher Education: Ghayath Barakat
 Minister of Culture: Riyad Naassan Agha
 Minister of Housing and Construction: Hammoud al-Hussein
 Minister of Oil and Mineral Reserves: Sufian Allaw
 Minister of Electricity: Ahmad Khaled al-Ali
 Minister of Transport: Yaarub Bader
 Minister of Industry: Fuad Issa al-Jouni
 Minister of Communication and Technology: Amr Nazir Salem
 Minister of State for Parliamentary Affairs: Joseph Sweid
 Minister of State for Vital Projects: Hussein Mahmoud Farzat
 Minister of State for International Relations: Hassan al-Sari

4th reshuffle
8 December 2007: Two ministers were replaced.
 Minister of Communications and Technology: Imad Abdel Ghani Sabouni
 Minister of Endowments: Mohammed Abdul Sattar

5th reshuffle
30 July 2008: One minister was replaced.
 Minister of Expatriates: Dr. Joseph Sweid

6th reshuffle
18 September 2008: Two ministers were replaced.
 Minister of Housing and Construction: Omar Ibrahim Ghalawanji
 Minister of Electricity: Dr. Ahmad Qusay Kayyali

7th reshuffle
23 April 2009: Five ministers were replaced, and a new ministry was established, Ministry of the Environment.
 Minister of Local Administration: Dr. Tamer al-Hajjeh
 Minister of Interior: Major General Said Mohammad Sammour
 Minister of Health: Dr. Rida Said
 Minister of State for Presidential Affairs: Dr. Mansour Azzam
 Minister of Justice: Ahmad Younes
 Minister of State of the Environment: Kawkab Sabah al-Daya

8th reshuffle
3 June 2009: One minister was replaced.
Minister of Defense: Lt. Gen. Ali Habib Mahmud

9th reshuffle
19 January 2010: One minister was replaced.
Minister of Economy and Trade: Lamia Assi

10th reshuffle
3 October 2010: Two ministers were replaced.
 Minister of Culture: Riad Ismat
 Minister of Irrigation: George Malki Soumi

Full resignation
29 March 2011: All ministers resigned from their posts at the President's request. The Prime Minister was then reappointed to run a caretaker government, and the other ministers were kept in place.

See also
Cabinet of Syria
Government ministries of Syria
List of prime ministers of Syria
List of foreign ministers of Syria

References

2003 establishments in Syria
Bashar al-Assad
Syria
 
Lists of political office-holders in Syria
2011 disestablishments in Syria
Cabinets established in 2003
Cabinets disestablished in 2011